The United States' Central Intelligence Agency (CIA) made numerous unsuccessful attempts to assassinate Cuban leader Fidel Castro. There were also attempts by Cuban exiles, sometimes in cooperation with the CIA. The 1975 Church Committee claimed eight proven CIA assassination attempts between 1960 and 1965. In 1976, President Gerald Ford issued an Executive Order banning political assassinations. In 2006, Fabián Escalante, former chief of Cuba's counterintelligence, stated that there had been 634 assassination schemes or attempts. The last known plot to assassinate Castro was by Cuban exiles in 2000.

Background
Castro went to Roman catholic boarding school, and began his political career while at the School of Law of the University of Havana. After World War II the United States secretly became involved in international political assassination attempts on foreign leaders. This program was contrary to the United Nations Charter, and U.S. officials denied its existence. On March 5, 1972, Director of Central Intelligence Richard Helms declared that "no such activity or operations be undertaken, assisted, or suggested by any of our personnel." In 1975, the U.S. Senate convened the Senate Select Committee to Study Governmental Operations with Respect to Intelligence Activities, chaired by Senator Frank Church (D-Idaho). The Church Committee found that the CIA and other agencies employed a tactic of plausible deniability during decision-making related to assassinations, with CIA subordinates shielding higher-ranking officials from responsibility by withholding information. Government employees were obtaining tacit approval by using euphemisms in communications. Fidel Castro died in 2016 at the age of 90.

Early attempts
According to CIA Director Richard Helms, Kennedy Administration officials exerted a heavy pressure on the CIA to "get rid of Castro." It explains a staggering number of assassination plots, aiming at creating a favorable impression on President John F. Kennedy. There were five phases in the assassination attempts, with planning involving the CIA, the Department of Defense, and the State Department: Prior to August 1960, from August 1960 to April 1961, from April 1961 to late 1961, from late 1961 to late 1962, and from late 1962 to late 1963. Fidel Castro survived over 600 assassination attempts, as well as attempts to end his political career in other ways. One of these attempts  involved a chemical with comparable effects to the drug LSD sprayed in the air of the room where Castro would broadcast from his radio station, with the goal of making him lose composure and speak erratically while on air. While this example may not be as dangerous as an assassination, if successful, this attempt could have been damaging to Castro's career. Another early attempt relied on the knowledge that he loved diving. The CIA decided to create an infected diving suit that would kill Castro slowly, over a long period of time, by lining the suit with tuberculosis.  The infected diving suit did not succeed. The plan was betrayed and Castro learned of the attempt.   

According to columnist Jack Anderson, the first CIA attempt to assassinate Castro was part of the Bay of Pigs Invasion operation, but five more CIA teams were sent, the last apprehended on a rooftop within rifle range of Castro, at the end of February or beginning of March 1963.
Attorney Robert Maheu, who was working as a CIA cutout at the time, was identified as the team leader, who recruited John Roselli, a gambler with contacts in the Italian American Mafia and Cuban underworlds. The CIA assigned two operations officers, William King Harvey and James O'Connell, to accompany Roselli to Miami to recruit the actual teams.

Mafia engagement

According to the CIA documents, the so-called Family Jewels that were declassified in 2007, one assassination attempt on Fidel Castro prior to the Bay of Pigs invasion involved noted American mobsters John Roselli, Sam Giancana and Santo Trafficante. At least some of the CIA assassination attempts on Castro were given the CIA project name ZRRIFLE. 

In September 1960, Momo Salvatore Giancana, a successor of Al Capone's in the Chicago Outfit, and Miami Syndicate leader Santo Trafficante, who were both on the FBI's Ten Most Wanted list at that time, were indirectly contacted by the CIA about the possibility of Fidel Castro's assassination. Johnny Roselli, a member of the Las Vegas Syndicate, was used to get access to Mafia bosses. The go-between from the CIA was Robert Maheu of the Howard Hughes organization, who introduced himself as a representative of several international businesses in Cuba that were expropriated by Castro. On September 14, 1960, Maheu met with Roselli in a New York City hotel and offered him US$150,000 for the "removal" of Castro. James O'Connell, who identified himself as Maheu's associate but who actually was the chief of the CIA's operational support division, was present during the meeting. The declassified documents did not reveal if Roselli, Giancana or Trafficante accepted a down payment for the job. According to the CIA files, it was Giancana who suggested poison pills as a means to doctor Castro's food or drinks. Such pills, manufactured by the CIA's Technical Services Division, were given to Giancana's nominee named Juan Orta. Giancana recommended Orta as being an official in the Cuban government, who had access to Castro.

Allegedly, after several unsuccessful attempts to introduce the poison into Castro's food, Orta abruptly demanded to be let out of the mission, handing over the job to another unnamed participant. Later, a second attempt was mounted through Giancana, Roselli, and Trafficante using Anthony Varona, the leader of the Cuban Exile Junta, who had, according to Trafficante, become "disaffected with the apparent ineffectual progress of the Junta". Verona requested US$10,000 in expenses and US$1,000 worth of communications equipment. However, the second assassination attempt was apparently thwarted when Castro stopped visiting the restaurant that had the botulinum toxin poison pills, and was cancelled due to the launching of the Bay of Pigs Invasion.

According to Top Secret transcripts declassified in 2021, Scott Breckinridge, in his 1975 Church Committee hearing told senators that the CIA had also contemplated using botulinum toxin to lace cigars to be delivered to Castro, but this plan never went forward.

On October 26, 2017, during the presidency of Donald Trump, declassified documents revealed that US Attorney General Robert Kennedy hesitated to recruit the Mafia in assassination attempts on Castro due to his push against organized crime. When President Trump was asked about assassination attempts on other political figures such as Putin in Russia,  he replied, "You think our country’s so innocent?"

Later attempts
The Church Committee stated that it substantiated eight attempts by the CIA to assassinate Fidel Castro in 1960–1965. Fabián Escalante, a retired chief of Cuba's counterintelligence, who had been tasked with protecting Castro, estimated the number of assassination schemes or actual attempts by the Central Intelligence Agency to be 638, a project code-named Executive Action, and split them among U.S. administrations as follows: Dwight D. Eisenhower, 38; John F. Kennedy, 42; Lyndon B. Johnson, 72; Richard Nixon, 184; Jimmy Carter, 64; Ronald Reagan, 197; George H. W. Bush, 16; Bill Clinton, 21.
Some of them were a part of the covert CIA program dubbed Operation Mongoose aimed at toppling the Cuban government. The assassination attempts reportedly included cigars poisoned with botulinum toxin, a tubercle bacilli-infected scuba-diving suit along with a booby-trapped conch placed on the sea bottom, an exploding cigar (Castro loved cigars and scuba diving, but he quit smoking in 1985), and plain, mafia-style execution endeavors, among others. There were plans to blow up Castro during his visit to Ernest Hemingway's museum in Cuba.

Some of the plots were depicted in a documentary film entitled 638 Ways to Kill Castro (2006) aired on Channel 4 of the British public-service television. One of these attempts was by his ex-lover Marita Lorenz, whom he met in 1959. She agreed to aid the CIA and attempted to smuggle a jar of cold cream containing poison pills into his room. When Castro learned about her intentions, he reportedly gave her a gun and told her to kill him but her nerves failed. Some plots aimed not at murder but at character assassination; they, for example, involved using thallium salts to destroy Castro's famous beard, or lacing his radio studio with LSD to cause him disorientation during the broadcast and damage his public image.

When Castro travelled abroad, the CIA cooperated with Cuban exiles for some of the more serious assassination attempts. The last documented attempt on Castro's life was in 2000, and involved placing 90 kg of explosives under a podium in Panama where he would give a talk. Castro’s personal security team discovered the explosives before he arrived. Castro once said, in regards to the numerous attempts on his life he believed had been made, "If surviving assassination attempts were an Olympic event, I would win the gold medal."

The CIA in 1962 considered a plan called "Operation Bounty", which would have involved dropping leaflets over Cuba offering financial rewards to the Cuban population for the assassination of various individuals, including $5,000 to $20,000 for informants, $57,000 for department heads, $97,000 for foreign Communists operating in Cuba, up to $1 million for members of the Cuban government, and only $0.02 for Castro himself, which was meant "to denigrate" him in the eyes of the Cuban people. The top secret document which revealed the plan, which was never put into practice, was one of 2,800 related to the federal investigation of the Kennedy assassination, which were released as scheduled in October 2017.

Reactions

The Church Committee rejected political assassination as a foreign policy tool and declared that it was "incompatible with American principle, international order, and morality." It recommended Congress to consider developing a statute to eradicate such or similar practices, which was never introduced. In 1976 President Gerald Ford signed Executive Order 11905, which stated that "No employee of the United States government shall engage in, or conspire in, political assassination."

See also

 638 Ways to Kill Castro
 Church Committee
 Cuban Project
 Foreign interventions by the United States
 United States involvement in regime change

References

Fidel Castro
Castro, Fidel
Central Intelligence Agency operations
Cuba–United States relations